Protomelas virgatus is a species of cichlid endemic to Lake Malawi.  This species can reach a length of  SL.  It can also be found in the aquarium trade.

References

virgatus
Fish of Lake Malawi
Fish of Malawi
Fish described in 1935
Taxonomy articles created by Polbot